Pterostichus morio is a species of ground beetles in the subfamily Pterostichinae.

Description
Body is black, with reddish femora. These beetles are predatory.

Distribution
This species is present in Austria, France, Italy, Poland, Slovakia, Slovenia and Switzerland. These beetles can be found under rocks and prefer slightly moist, sandy soil.

Subspecies
Pterostichus morio baudii (Chaudoir, 1868) 
Pterostichus morio carpathicus Kult, 1944 
Pterostichus morio guedeli Sainte-Claire Deville, 1902 
Pterostichus morio liguricus J. Daniel, 1903 
Pterostichus morio morio (Duftschmid, 1812) 
Pterostichus morio samniticus A. Fiori, 1896 
Pterostichus morio validiusculus (Chaudoir, 1859)

References

Pterostichinae
Beetles described in 1812
Beetles of Europe